Aquileo J. Echeverría (May 22, 1866 in San José, Costa Rica – March 11, 1909 in Barcelona) was a Costa Rican politician, writer, and journalist.

Early life
After graduating from the National Institute, Echeverria fell on hard times. He enlisted in the military expedition against Barrios's Guatemala. After the expedition he stayed for a while in Nicaragua, forging a good relationship with President General Cárdenas. Echeverría also served in the Nicaraguan government.

Return to Costa Rica
Echeverría returned to Costa Rica and became a journalist. He worked in publications like The Republic, Trade, Costa Rica Illustrated and La Patria. In 1887 he was appointed Attaché at the Embassy of Costa Rica in Washington, D.C. There he participated in the historic border agreement between Costa Rica and Nicaragua.

Honours
The Premio Nacional Aquileo J. Echeverría was named for him and created by the Costa Rican Ministry of Youth Culture and Sports (Ministerio de Cultura Juventud y Deportes) in 1961.

Literary work

Romances (1903)
Romances and miscellaneous
Concherías (1905)
Poetry, concherías and epigrams (1918)
Chronicles and my stories (1934)
Concherías, romance and epigrams (1950)
Concherías, ballads, epigrams and Other Poems (1953)

External links
https://web.archive.org/web/20100403043154/http://www.mcjdcr.go.cr/premios/index.html 
https://web.archive.org/web/20101125052418/http://lacarretica.com/personajes/aquileoecheverria01.asp 
http://www.lectorias.com/aquileoecheverria.html 
http://www.biografiasyvidas.com/biografia/e/echeverria.htm

References

1866 births
1909 deaths
People from San José, Costa Rica
Costa Rican politicians
Costa Rican journalists
Male journalists